24H is the second Japanese-language extended play by South Korean boy group Seventeen. It was released on September 9, 2020, through Pledis Japan. With this album, Seventeen were the third group ever to reach number one on the Oricon Weekly Album Chart with four consecutive albums.

Track listing

Charts

Certifications

References 

2020 EPs
Japanese-language EPs
Seventeen (South Korean band) EPs
Hybe Corporation EPs